Amelanotic melanoma is a type of skin cancer in which the cells do not make any melanin. They can be pink, red, purple or of normal skin color, and are therefore difficult to diagnose correctly. They can occur anywhere on the body, just as a typical melanoma can. 

Often, amelanotic melanomas are mistaken for benign lesions, including dermatitis, benign neoplastic processes, or a different malignancy such as basal-cell carcinoma or squamous-cell carcinoma. A poor prognosis is associated with amelanotic lesions, partially due to the difficulty in achieving a diagnosis; however, metastatic amelanotic melanoma has a worse prognosis than other subtypes.

Survival after diagnosis of amelanotic melanoma was found in a 2014 seven-year study of 3,000 patients to be poorer than for pigmented melanoma, which was attributed to the more advanced stage at diagnosis due probably to difficulty of diagnosis. The study also suggested that amelanotic melanomas might grow faster than pigmented melanomas.

See also 
 Melanoma
 List of cutaneous conditions

References

External links 

 Amelanotic melanoma entry in the public domain NCI Dictionary of Cancer Terms

Melanoma